National Indoor Soccer League has been the name of two different American professional indoor soccer leagues:

National Indoor Soccer League (2008–2014)
National Indoor Soccer League (2021-)